The 2021 FIA Formula One World Championship was a motor racing championship for Formula One cars which was the 72nd running of the Formula One World Championship. It is recognised by the Fédération Internationale de l'Automobile (FIA), the governing body of international motorsport, as the highest class of competition for open-wheel racing cars. The championship was contested over twenty-two Grands Prix, and held around the world. Drivers and teams competed for the titles of World Drivers' Champion and World Constructors' Champion, respectively.

At season's end in Abu Dhabi, Max Verstappen of Red Bull Racing-Honda won the Drivers' Championship for the first time in his career. Verstappen became the first ever driver from the Netherlands, the first Honda-powered driver since Ayrton Senna in 1991, the first Red Bull driver since Sebastian Vettel in 2013 and the first non-Mercedes driver in the turbo-hybrid era to win the World Championship.

Honda became the second engine supplier in the turbo-hybrid era to power a championship winning car, after Mercedes. Four-time defending and seven-time champion Lewis Hamilton of Mercedes finished runner up. Mercedes retained the Constructors' Championship for the eighth consecutive season.

The season ended with a controversial finish, with the two title rivals for the drivers' crown entering the last race of the season with equal points. Verstappen sealed the title after winning the season-ending Abu Dhabi Grand Prix after a last-lap restart pass on Hamilton following a contentious conclusion of a safety car period. Mercedes initially protested the results, and later decided not to appeal after their protest was denied. The incident led to key structural changes to race control, including the removal of Michael Masi from his role as race director and the implementation of a virtual race control room, who assist the race director. Unlapping procedures behind the safety car were to be reassessed and presented by the F1 Sporting Advisory Committee prior to the start of the 2022 World Championship season. On 10 March 2022 the FIA World Motor Sport Council report on the events of the final race of the season was announced, and that the "Race Director called the safety car back into the pit lane without it having completed an additional lap as required by the Formula 1 Sporting Regulations", however also noted that the "results of the 2021 Abu Dhabi Grand Prix and the FIA Formula One World Championship are valid, final and cannot now be changed".

This was the first season since 2008 where the champion driver was not from the team that took the constructors' title. The season was also the final season in the sport for 2007 World Champion Kimi Räikkönen.

Entries

The following constructors and drivers were under contract to compete in the 2021 World Championship. All teams competed with tyres supplied by Pirelli.  Each team was required to enter at least two drivers, one for each of the two mandatory cars.

Free practice drivers 
Across the season, five drivers drove as a test or third driver in free practice sessions. Callum Ilott and Robert Kubica drove for Alfa Romeo Racing at two and three Grands Prix respectively, while Roy Nissany and Jack Aitken drove for Williams at three Grands Prix and at the Abu Dhabi Grand Prix, respectively. Zhou Guanyu drove for Alpine at the Austrian Grand Prix.

Team changes
Racing Point became known as Aston Martin. The name change was brought about by the team's part owner Lawrence Stroll investing in the Aston Martin marque. Renault became known as Alpine, taking on the name of Renault's sportscar brand.

Driver changes

Four-time World Drivers' Champion Sebastian Vettel left Ferrari at the end of the  Championship after racing with the team for six seasons. Vettel's seat was taken by Carlos Sainz Jr., who had left McLaren. Daniel Ricciardo moved from Renault to McLaren, where he replaced Sainz.

Vettel moved to Aston Martin, where he replaced Sergio Pérez. Pérez, who had previously signed a contract to drive for Aston Martin's predecessor, Racing Point, until 2022, moved to Red Bull Racing where he replaced Alexander Albon, who was Red Bull Racing's reserve and test driver for the 2021 season.

Romain Grosjean and Kevin Magnussen, who had raced for Haas since  and  respectively, left the team at the end of 2020. 2020 Formula 2 Champion Mick Schumacher, the son of seven-time World Champion Michael Schumacher, took one of the seats at the team while the other was filled by Nikita Mazepin, who finished fifth in the Formula 2 Championship.

Yuki Tsunoda, who finished third in 2020 Formula 2 Championship, graduated to Formula One with Scuderia AlphaTauri, replacing Daniil Kvyat, who moved to Alpine as their reserve driver.

Mid-season changes
During the Dutch Grand Prix weekend, Kimi Räikkönen tested positive for coronavirus. He was replaced at Alfa Romeo Racing by reserve driver Robert Kubica, who last raced at the 2019 Abu Dhabi Grand Prix, driving for Williams. Räikkönen was also replaced by Kubica at the subsequent Italian Grand Prix.

Calendar
The 2021 calendar consisted of twenty-two events, which were subject to the permissive COVID-19 regulations set by local governments and the Formula One Group. The British, Italian and São Paulo Grands Prix featured the sprint qualifying format.

The following rounds were planned, but were cancelled in response to the COVID-19 pandemic:

Calendar expansion and changes from 2020 to 2021
Liberty Media, the sport's commercial rights holders, announced that there would be scope for the 2021 calendar to expand beyond the planned twenty-two races of the 2020 calendar. The sporting regulations were amended to allow for a maximum of twenty-five Grands Prix per year.
 The Emilia Romagna Grand Prix at the Autodromo Internazionale Enzo e Dino Ferrari in Imola, which was originally intended to be held as a one-off event in 2020, was the second round of the championship.
 The Portuguese Grand Prix at the Autódromo Internacional do Algarve in Portimão, which was originally intended to make a one-off return in 2020, was the third round of the championship.
 The Styrian Grand Prix at the Red Bull Ring in Spielberg, which was originally intended to be a one-off race in 2020, was the eighth round of the championship, meaning the circuit hosted back-to-back races for a second season in a row.
 The Dutch Grand Prix was revived, with the race taking place at the Circuit Zandvoort. The race marked the first time the Dutch Grand Prix has been run since . The Dutch Grand Prix had been included on the 2020 calendar, but was cancelled in response to the COVID-19 pandemic.
 The Turkish Grand Prix at Istanbul Park in Istanbul, which was originally intended to make a one-off return in 2020, was the sixteenth round of the championship.
 The Qatar Grand Prix made its debut, with the race held at the Losail International Circuit, the venue which has hosted the Qatar motorcycle Grand Prix since 2004. Further plans to have the Grand Prix into the calendar on a 10-year contract from  onwards at a new purpose-built circuit were also revealed, before being retained in Lusail. The race took place at night, the fourth venue which hosted a night race after the Singapore, Bahrain and Sakhir Grands Prix.
 The Saudi Arabian Grand Prix also made its debut, with the race held on a temporary circuit in the city of Jeddah. Further plans to move the Grand Prix to Qiddiya in 2023 were also made public, before being retained in Jeddah. The race took place at night, becoming the fifth venue to host a night race after the Singapore, Bahrain, Sakhir and Qatar Grands Prix.
 The Vietnamese Grand Prix would have made its debut, with the race scheduled to take place in the capital Hanoi on the Hanoi Circuit. The Vietnamese Grand Prix had been included on the 2020 calendar, but was cancelled in response to the COVID-19 pandemic. The Grand Prix was dropped from the 2021 calendar because of the arrest on corruption charges of former Hanoi chairman Nguyễn Đức Chung, a key official responsible for organising the race.
Further changes to the calendar are planned following the disruption to the 2020 championship brought about by the COVID-19 pandemic:
 The Azerbaijan and Monaco Grands Prix returned to the calendar. These Grands Prix were removed from the re-issued 2020 schedule because of the logistical difficulties associated with establishing a street circuit on short notice.
 The Brazilian, French and United States Grands Prix also return. The 2020 races, together with the debut of the Mexico City Grand Prix, were cancelled because of the pandemic. The returning Brazilian Grand Prix was renamed as the São Paulo Grand Prix in deference to the increased involvement from local government.
 The 70th Anniversary, Eifel, Sakhir and Tuscan Grands Prix were not included in the list of 2021 races. These Grands Prix were specifically introduced into the 2020 calendar in response to the COVID-19 pandemic, to ensure that as many races as possible could be held.

Liberty Media was also reported to have come to an agreement in principle with race organisers to host a second race in the United States. Plans to hold the race at a circuit in Miami Gardens were unveiled. A second proposal to move the former Brazilian Grand Prix from São Paulo to a new circuit in Rio de Janeiro was also suspended.

Calendar changes due to the COVID-19 pandemic 

The original calendar that was approved by the FIA World Motor Sport Council included the Chinese Grand Prix, which was due to take place on 11 April. However, the event was postponed and later cancelled, due to travel restrictions. The  at the Autodromo Enzo e Dino Ferrari in Imola, which was originally intended to be a one-off Grand Prix in 2020, was retained in its place. Additionally, the Australian Grand Prix, which had been due to take place on 21 March as the inaugural Grand Prix of the championship, was postponed to 21 November. On 6 July 2021, the postponement of the Australian Grand Prix was revised to be a cancellation for a second consecutive year, due to low vaccination rates and travel restrictions in place in Victoria. The dates for the São Paulo, Saudi Arabian and Abu Dhabi Grands Prix were changed to accommodate this.

On 28 April 2021, the Canadian Grand Prix was cancelled for a second consecutive year and was replaced by the Turkish Grand Prix, originally intended to make a one-off return in 2020. On 14 May 2021, the Turkish Grand Prix was postponed due to the British government imposing a ten-day hotel quarantine on travellers from Turkey into the United Kingdom. As a result, the French Grand Prix was moved forward a week and the Styrian Grand Prix, which was originally intended to be a one-off race in 2020, was added to the calendar in its place. On 4 June 2021, the Singapore Grand Prix, which was originally due to take place on 3 October, was cancelled due to ongoing safety and logistic concerns and was replaced by the re-joined Turkish Grand Prix.

On 18 August 2021, the Japanese Grand Prix was cancelled for a second consecutive year. The race calendar was revised again on 28 August 2021, consisting of twenty-two Grands Prix, with the Turkish, Mexico City and São Paulo Grands Prix moved a week later, the round in which the cancelled Australian Grand Prix was due to take place left empty in order to replace it, and the confirmation that the Japanese Grand Prix would not be replaced. On 30 September 2021 the new Qatar Grand Prix was announced in place of the cancelled Australian Grand Prix.

Regulation changes
The 2021 championship was originally due to introduce significant changes to the regulations, including the sport's governance, car designs and the sporting rules but these were delayed in March 2020 in response to the disruption caused by the COVID-19 pandemic.

Financial regulation
The championship introduced a budget cap, with teams limited to spending a maximum of $145 million per year. Teams were required to use more commercially available materials and to submit their annual expenditure. Some teams argued to further reduce the budget cap to $100 million, citing concerns that the long-term financial impact of the COVID-19 pandemic threatens the future of as many as four teams. Formula One managing director Ross Brawn stated that the sport's intention is to reduce the budget cap further in the coming years.

The value of the budget cap was set for twenty-one races; each additional race increased the budget cap by $1 million, and vice versa: each race removed from the scheduled twenty-one race calendar deducted the budget cap by $1 million. However, the budget cap did not include marketing budget, drivers' salaries, and the salaries of the team's top three executives. In addition, under a later agreement among the teams regarding the introduction of sprint qualifying races, each team received an additional $500,000 for the three sprint qualifying races on top of the current budget cap, and further flexibility on budget cap in case the cars got damaged during the sprint qualifying races. There were also additional restrictions dictating how prize money can be spent. The cap only applied to expenditure related to car performance, which remained in place until 2026. In the event that a team broke the financial regulations, the team can be penalised. It was originally planned a range of punishments for exceeding their annual budget, which include being deducted championship points, having reduced testing time, a race ban, or—for the most severe cases—disqualification from the championship. However, Toto Wolff later revealed that the intended sporting penalties such as points deductions and reduced testing for budget cap breaches would not be handed out, having been voted down by three teams including Red Bull and Ferrari.

Technical regulations
Teams were limited in what components could be modified for the 2021 season, with this requirement introduced to ease financial pressures on teams brought about by the COVID-19 pandemic. The teams were allowed to apply for special dispensation to make changes, most notably in the case of McLaren, who were given permission to modify their car to accommodate the switch from Renault to Mercedes engines. This prompted the FIA to introduce a token system whereby teams were given a series of tokens which could be exchanged for the introduction of specific component upgrades.

Some aerodynamic rule changes were enacted by the FIA. The floor of the cars were 'clipped' in order to reduce downforce for 2021. In 2020, the floor was permitted to run in a straight line from an area adjacent to the cockpit back to a point ahead of the rear tyre. However, from 2021 that point ahead of the tyre was moved  inboard, making the floor edge a diagonal line when viewed from above. This change is expected to reduce downforce levels by 5%. These three changes have reduced downforce levels by a further 5%, meaning the 2021 regulations have seen a total 10% reduction in downforce. However, the teams increased downforce by 4–5% over the winter, so the overall downforce reduction was approximately 5%.

The "dual-axis steering" (DAS) system developed by Mercedes in 2020 was banned, starting from 2021. The DAS system allowed the driver to adjust the toe of the front wheels to optimise mechanical grip by pulling or pushing on the steering wheel. The FIA introduced newly revised wing load tests mid-season at the French Grand Prix to clamp down on potentially excessively flexing rear wings. This comes after Lewis Hamilton and his Mercedes team had claimed, at the Spanish Grand Prix, that the rear wing of the Red Bull RB16B flexed significantly at high speed and load, allowing greater top speeds. Under 2021 Formula One regulations wings must be immobile and rigidly attached to the bodywork.

From the Belgian Grand Prix onwards a new technical directive was enforced surrounding pit stop equipment after concerns teams were flouting the article 12.8.4 of Formula One technical regulations that state that pit equipment may only be filled with compressed air or nitrogen and that sensors on this equipment must 'act passively' to achieve quicker pit stop times and potentially meaning cars could be released in an unsafe condition. To help enforce this new tolerance parameters will be introduced of 0.15 seconds from when the tyres have been fitted and tightened to the dropping of the jack and 0.2 seconds from the dropping of the jack to a car being released by the pit crew. The change was originally supposed to come in for the Hungarian Grand Prix, but was postponed. In a further clarification the FIA will have the means of ensuring the new tolerance limits are adhered to by using an intelligent wheel gun.

Sporting regulations
It was originally proposed that teams would be required to allow a driver who had competed in fewer than two  to replace one of their race drivers in a Friday practice session over the course of the season. Whilst these rules were intended to give a chance to more non-Formula One drivers to test a Formula One car, the wording of this rule meant that teams satisfy the requirement if one of their regular drivers was in their rookie season. Such rules were instead implemented for the 2022 season.

Following the Mercedes tyre error during the 2020 Sakhir Grand Prix, where George Russell was given front tyres allocated to Valtteri Bottas during a pit stop, the FIA had adjusted the rules on tyre usage; drivers using mixed compound sets or using sets allocated to another driver on their cars were permitted to complete two laps before the driver must pit to correct the error before facing a penalty. Under the previous rules, drivers could be disqualified as soon as such error had occurred. The race time limit for red-flagged races was also be reduced from four hours to three hours. From the 2021 United States Grand Prix, lap times set under double waved yellow flags were automatically deleted.

Race weekend changes
For the 2021 season, the schedule of a race weekend was revised. Under the pre-existing regulations, a race weekend spanned four days, with the Thursday before the race being reserved for media and promotional events and scrutineering; however, under the new regulations all of Thursday's events were moved to the Friday morning, with the times between activities on that day being reduced. Cars were under parc fermé conditions following the end of free practice three instead of qualifying, further restricting teams and drivers from making major changes to setups ahead of the race. The length of the two Friday practice sessions were cut from 90 minutes (as had been the case since the  season) to 60 minutes. The 2021 W Series for female drivers was added to the list of support racing series alongside Formula 2, Formula 3, and Porsche Supercup. The 2021 W Series season started at the Red Bull Ring, where it was a support event for the Styrian Grand Prix in late June. It ended in late October at the Mexico City Grand Prix. Formula 2 and Formula 3 supported Formula One on alternate weekends, rather than the same ones as a cost saving measure.

There were a trial of sprint qualifying at the British, Italian, and São Paulo Grands Prix. Qualifying for these sprints took place on Friday afternoon in place of the normal second practice session and the sprints ran over the least number of laps to exceed , approximately one third of a normal race distance. The result of the sprint race determined the starting grid for the main race. Three points were awarded to the winner of the sprint race, two points to the runner-up, and one point to the third-placed finisher; sprint races are set to be expanded for the  season. The British Grand Prix timetable for 16–18 July revealed that there would be no running for Formula One cars until 14:30 local time on Friday with the normal Qualifying starting at 18:00. Normally, the second Practice Session would have been at around 14:00, with no running in the evening. A second practice session is due to start at 12:00 on Saturday, before the Sprint Qualifying at 16:30. The main race is due to start at 15:00 on Sunday. At events with Sprint Qualifying, the parc fermé was now brought forward to Friday after normal Qualifying, which saw drivers only allowed to use the softest available tyre with the usual requirement for the top 10 to start on the tyres they used for their best lap in Q2 removed for events including Sprint Qualifying in their schedule. There is also no requirement to make a pit stop during Sprint Qualifying, and all 20 drivers at events where Sprint Qualifying takes place were given free tyre choice ahead of Sunday's Grand Prix. Teams were given a $500,000 overall grant by the FIA to cover the cost of the scheduled three sprint races.

Season summary

Pre-season
Winter testing switched from the Circuit de Barcelona-Catalunya in Montmeló to the Bahrain International Circuit in Sakhir, with three days of running beginning on 12 March. Formula One declined an offer from Bahrain to provide COVID-19 vaccines for all personnel attending pre-season testing and the season's opening Grand Prix. However, several teams and drivers opted to accept the Bahrain government's offer.

Opening rounds
Max Verstappen took pole position on the opening round in Bahrain. On the formation lap, Sergio Pérez stalled at the last turn and was relegated to start in the pit lane, leaving his 11th place spot vacant. On the first lap, Nikita Mazepin spun at turn 3, crashing into the barrier and calling out the safety car. AlphaTauri's Pierre Gasly collided with Daniel Ricciardo’s McLaren the lap after the safety car ended, while Mick Schumacher spun off behind the pack. Lewis Hamilton got past Verstappen on lap 40, but on lap 53 Verstappen overtook Hamilton at turn 4, before being ordered to give the place back because he exceeded track limits. In the end, Hamilton won from Verstappen, and Valtteri Bottas completed the podium. Lando Norris came fourth and Pérez, after starting from last, recovered to fifth.

At the Emilia Romagna Grand Prix, Hamilton took pole from Pérez and Verstappen. Verstappen went into the lead at turn 1 on lap 1, after it started raining on race day. Mazepin and Nicholas Latifi crashed at the exit of turn 13, bringing out the safety car. Under the safety car, Schumacher lost control of his car and spun into the pit exit, losing his front wing. On lap 31, at turn 7, Hamilton made a mistake, hitting the wall and damaging his front wing. After approximately a minute in the gravel, he rejoined. After the race restarted, Norris overtook Charles Leclerc for second, but the former was overtaken by Hamilton, resulting in a podium of Verstappen, Hamilton and Norris.

He kept his lead from Hamilton and Verstappen. On lap 2, Kimi Räikkönen made contact with his teammate, Antonio Giovinazzi, and was forced into retirement, while Giovinazzi could continue. Hamilton eventually overtook Bottas and won with Verstappen in second and Bottas in third. Pérez and Norris came fourth and fifth, respectively. Verstappen took the fastest lap on the last lap but was soon deleted, due to track limits, meaning Bottas was given the fastest lap point.

Hamilton took his 100th pole position in Spain. On lap 1, Verstappen overtook him at the first turn. Five laps later, Yuki Tsunoda pulled over at the reprofiled turn 10, marking his first Formula One retirement. Hamilton took the lead after Verstappen pitted on lap 23, but Verstappen took it back on lap 28. However, a slow stop and a decision to stay out until lap 59 let Hamilton into the lead until the checkered flag, Verstappen ended up second with Bottas in third place from Leclerc and Pérez.

Leclerc took pole at the Monaco Grand Prix despite crashing in the final minutes. The crash caused a driveshaft failure, meaning he was unable to start the race. Verstappen started at the front and led from Bottas and Carlos Sainz Jr. On lap 30, Bottas was forced into retirement after his front-right tyre would not come off during a routine pitstop. Verstappen took the victory, as well as the championship lead for the first time in his career; Red Bull came away from this race with a one-point lead in the Constructors' Championship. Behind Verstappen, Sainz took his first podium for Ferrari, and Norris took his second podium of the season in third place.

Leclerc took pole again in Azerbaijan, this time he was able to start the race. He led for one lap before Hamilton got past on lap 2 at turn 1. Hamilton was held up in his pitstop to allow Gasly to pass him in the pitlane, handing Verstappen the net race lead. On lap 30, Lance Stroll crashed out due to a tyre failure and brought out the safety car. With Verstappen comfortably leading with six laps to go, he suffered a tyre failure, causing him to crash on the pit straight, bringing out the safety car and then the red flag on lap 46 and 48, respectively. The race was restarted with two laps of racing left. Hamilton went up the inside of Pérez at the restart, but forgot to adjust his brake bias and missed the corner. Pérez won for the second time in his career and took his first win for Red Bull. Sebastian Vettel took Aston Martin's first podium in Formula One, while Gasly took his third career podium.

In France, Verstappen got his second pole of the season, only to go wide at the first turn and lose the lead to Hamilton in the first lap. After regaining first with an undercut in his first pit stop, Verstappen found himself under heavy pressure from both Mercedes drivers. Verstappen relinquished his lead to pit a second time, one of two drivers to do so, returning to the track 18 seconds behind Hamilton. The speed advantage allowed him to make up the lost time, overtaking Bottas on lap 44 and Hamilton on the penultimate lap, for his third win of the year and his thirteenth win overall. Hamilton, now 12 points behind in the Drivers' Championship, did secure second, and with an overtake on lap 49, Pérez managed to take third place, pushing Bottas to fourth. It was the first race of the season where the race winner also took pole position and the fastest lap, and the first race of the season with no retirements. Red Bull extended their lead over Mercedes in the Constructors' Championship to 37 points after the race.

Mid-season rounds
Max Verstappen took his third season pole at the Styrian Grand Prix, the first of two back-to-back races at the Red Bull Ring. On the first lap, three cars collided at the third turn, forcing Pierre Gasly out of the race. Verstappen won from Lewis Hamilton, meaning Verstappen extended his title lead to 18 points. Valtteri Bottas came third, taking his first podium since Spain. Verstappen took pole at the Austrian Grand Prix, the last race of the first triple header. On the first lap, Esteban Ocon retired with broken suspension. Lando Norris received a penalty after being judged to have forced Sergio Pérez off track. Pérez later received two penalties for doing the same to Charles Leclerc. Verstappen won the race from Bottas and Norris. Hamilton finished fourth, after picking up damage to the underside of his car, meaning that Verstappen was able to extend his championship lead to 32 points.

Hamilton was fastest in qualifying to start in first place for the first ever sprint in the British Grand Prix. In the sprint, Verstappen made a better start than Hamilton and overtook him before the first corner, leading every lap and winning the sprint with Hamilton second and Bottas third, thus Verstappen started on pole for the Grand Prix itself. On lap five of the sprint, Pérez spun, dropping him to the back of the field, and later retiring, forcing him to start from the pits for the race. Hamilton made contact with Verstappen's right rear wheel, causing the tyre to come off and Verstappen travelled into the barrier, causing the race to be stopped temporarily. Hamilton was penalised for the contact with a ten-second penalty, which he served during his pit stop. Leclerc led most of the Grand Prix, but finished second after Hamilton overtook Norris, Bottas, and Leclerc in the late stages to win the race. Hamilton reduced his gap to Verstappen from 33 points to eight points.

Hamilton was again fastest in qualifying to take pole in the Hungarian Grand Prix. Rainy conditions at the start of the race led to Bottas misjudging his braking and sliding into the back of Norris; this escalated into multiple collisions which eventually eliminated five drivers: Bottas, Norris (who only retired on lap 3), Pérez, Lance Stroll and Leclerc. Due to the large amount of debris on the track, the race was red-flagged; at this stage, Hamilton led from Ocon and Sebastian Vettel, with championship leader Verstappen, having acquired damage on the opening lap, in 13th. Hamilton was the only driver who did not choose to pit for slick tyres at the end of the formation lap, leaving him the only driver on the grid for the restart; this saw him drop to last when he pitted on the next lap. In the pits, Kimi Räikkönen was released into Nikita Mazepin’s path, putting Mazepin out of the race. The newly promoted Ocon held his lead until the end to take his first Formula 1 victory, finishing ahead of Vettel, and Hamilton, who had battled his way back up the classification, and Carlos Sainz Jr. Vettel was later disqualified for a fuel sample issue, promoting Hamilton to second and Sainz to third. Hamilton's recovery drive saw him retake the championship lead over Verstappen by eight points, while Mercedes also regained their advantage over Red Bull in the Constructors' standings by twelve points. Meanwhile, Nicholas Latifi and George Russell were classified seventh and eighth, taking Williams's first points since 2019.

Verstappen took pole from Russell and Hamilton in the Belgian Grand Prix in a wet qualifying session. The race was heavily affected by rain, which initially saw the start delayed by 25 minutes. After two formation laps behind the safety car, the race start was suspended and red-flagged due to poor conditions and lack of visibility. A nearly three-hour delay followed before the race was resumed. After a further three laps, the race was red-flagged again. It was not restarted, becoming the shortest race in Formula 1 history and the sixth to award half-points as less than 75% of the race was completed. Verstappen won by default, with Russell in second and Hamilton in third place. It was Russell's first podium in Formula 1. As a result, Hamilton's lead in the championship was cut to three points from Verstappen.

Verstappen would again take pole at the first Dutch Grand Prix to take place since 1985 at Zandvoort. He held his lead from Hamilton to take the win at his home race, taking over the lead of the championship by three points. Bottas came third, overtaking Norris, who finished tenth, in the standings for third place. Bottas won sprint qualifying at the Italian Grand Prix, but was forced to start from the back of the grid after exceeding the quota of one on his power units' components. Verstappen started at the front with the McLarens second and third. Daniel Ricciardo took the lead on lap 1. A slow stop for Verstappen meant that he ended up alongside Hamilton after the latter made his pitstop. Hamilton and Verstappen collided, ending their races prematurely. Ricciardo led to the end to take his first victory since the 2018 Monaco Grand Prix and McLaren's first victory since the 2012 Brazilian Grand Prix. His teammate Norris finished behind him to secure the team's first 1–2 finish since the 2010 Canadian Grand Prix and the first 1–2 finish of the season. After a penalty applied to Pérez, Bottas came third from the back of the grid. After the race, Verstappen was judged by the stewards to have been predominantly at fault for the collision with Hamilton. As a result, he was given a 3-place grid-penalty for the next race and two penalty points on his super licence.

Verstappen was required to start from the back at the Russian Grand Prix for exceeding his quota of a number of his power unit components. Norris took his first career pole position, from Sainz (his best qualifying result), and Russell. The running order changed substantially as heavy rain began to fall in the closing laps. Hamilton took his 100th Formula One victory as well as the championship lead, ahead of Verstappen and Sainz.

Closing rounds 
Lewis Hamilton was the fastest in qualifying in Turkey, but was dropped down the grid because of a penalty due to a power unit component change. Valtteri Bottas was promoted to pole position and won the race, his first of 2021. He was followed by Max Verstappen, who re-took the championship lead, and Sergio Pérez, who took his first podium since France. Verstappen continued his momentum in the United States Grand Prix, taking pole position. Despite Hamilton taking the lead in turn 1, Verstappen was able to win the race with Hamilton in second place, in front of Pérez. The result increased Verstappen's lead to 12 points as Hamilton collected an extra Championship point by setting the fastest lap. Bottas took pole in Mexico City, but was spun around at the first corner by Daniel Ricciardo. Another incident behind involving Yuki Tsunoda and Mick Schumacher took both drivers out of the race, calling out the safety car. Verstappen took his second win in a row, increasing his lead from Hamilton in second, and Pérez took the final spot on the podium in his home race.

Hamilton was fastest in qualifying in Brazil, but was disqualified the following day for a technical infringement. Bottas won the qualifying sprint, giving him pole position for the Grand Prix. By finishing second in the sprint, Verstappen increased his championship lead over Hamilton by two points, and Carlos Sainz Jr., who finished third, increased Ferrari's championship lead over McLaren. Hamilton finished fifth in the sprint from last on the grid, but a five-place grid drop due to taking a new engine relegated him to tenth on the grid for the Grand Prix. On race day, both Verstappen and Pérez were able to overtake Bottas on the first lap. Meanwhile, Lando Norris and Sainz were involved in a separate incident, with Norris getting a puncture. On lap 48, Hamilton caught up to Verstappen and attempted an overtake, but failed and resulted in both of them going off track. Hamilton tried again on lap 59 and got past. He won the race from Verstappen, decreasing Verstappen's championship lead from 21 points to 14 points, while Bottas completed the podium.

Hamilton took pole position in Qatar, while a penalty for failing to respect double waived yellow flags during qualifying forced Verstappen to start from seventh. Hamilton took the win, leading every lap of the race. Verstappen quickly recovered to second place but was unable to threaten Hamilton's race lead despite setting the fastest lap on the last lap of the race. Fernando Alonso used a one-stop strategy to finish third, less than three seconds ahead Peréz in fourth, it was Alonso's first podium since the 2014 Hungarian Grand Prix. Bottas and Nicholas Latifi retired from the race after they and multiple others suffered punctures on track. The result reduced Verstappen's lead in the Driver's Championship to eight points while Mercedes's lead in the Constructors' Championship was reduced to five points.

Hamilton took pole position again in the inaugural Saudi Arabian Grand Prix ahead of Bottas and Verstappen, who crashed at the last corner of his final qualifying lap. The race played host to several incidents which saw the retirements of Schumacher, Pérez, George Russell, Nikita Mazepin, and Sebastian Vettel, with Hamilton, Verstappen, Tsunoda, and Kimi Räikkönen also being involved in collisions during the race. Hamilton won the race from Verstappen, while Bottas overtook Esteban Ocon at the final corner to take third place. The results left Hamilton and Verstappen on equal points in the Drivers' Championship going into the final round in Abu Dhabi, while Mercedes extended their lead in the Constructors Championship to 28 points.

Season finale and controversy 
Verstappen took the pole position in Abu Dhabi ahead of Hamilton and Norris. During the race, Hamilton had a better start and took the lead into the first turn. At turn six Verstappen attempted to pass, forcing Hamilton to evade by going off the track. Emerging from the corner still in the lead, Hamilton was instructed to give up the advantage he had gained. The pair settled in their positions until the first round of pit stops, with Hamilton gradually extending his lead. He later lost much of his advantage when Pérez, Verstappen's teammate with Red Bull, and who had yet to make a pit stop, made it difficult for Hamilton to pass him, though Verstappen was unable to capitalise. Later, a virtual safety car period allowed Verstappen to change his tyres without losing track position, which was an attempt to catch Hamilton with fresher tyres. With seven laps remaining, the safety car was brought out for a crash involving Latifi, and Red Bull used the opportunity to give Verstappen a fresh set of soft tyres, while Hamilton, still on his now-quite-old hard compound tyres, was not pitted. Race director Michael Masi took the decision to allow only the five lapped cars between Hamilton and Verstappen to unlap themselves before restarting the race with only one lap remaining. Upon the restart, Verstappen quickly passed Hamilton and held him off for the remainder of the lap to win the race and the championship.

Mercedes lodged two separate protests against the race's result. Both protests were dismissed, and Mercedes announced their intention to appeal the dismissal of the protest regarding the handling of the restart following the safety car period. 

A statement from the FIA acknowledged the controversy, and that it was "tarnishing the image of the championship and the due celebration". The statement was made after a meeting of the FIA World Motor Sport Council, which was scheduled for 15 December 2021, and was described as "extending an olive branch to Mercedes". On 16 December 2021, Mercedes announced that it had withdrawn its challenge to the race result. In addition, Hamilton boycotted the end of season FIA prize-giving ceremony, held on 16 December 2021, and at the time there were questions whether he would continue in F1. Hamilton was  investigated for breaching the Sporting Regulations which state the top three drivers in the championship must attend the FIA Gala. Newly elected FIA president Mohammed bin Sulayem stating in the immediate championship aftermath that there would be "no forgiveness" for Hamilton's failure to attend the event.

Post-season events
Following an FIA investigation and inquiry, Masi was removed from his role as race director, being replaced by Niels Wittich and Eduardo Freitas, with Herbie Blash appointed as a permanent senior advisor alongside Wittich and Freitas.

On 10 March 2022 the FIA World Motor Sport Council report on the events of the final race of the season was announced, and that the "Race Director called the safety car back into the pit lane without it having completed an additional lap as required by the Formula 1 Sporting Regulations", however also noted that the "results of the 2021 Abu Dhabi Grand Prix and the FIA Formula One World Championship are valid, final and cannot now be changed". Hamilton himself revealed that he had been fined for failing to the attend the FIA Prize Giving Gala asking for the governing  body to donate the proceeds to underprivileged children who want to get involved in motorsport.

Financial breaches 
In October 2022, the FIA published their review of the teams' budgets for 2021. Additionally, both Aston Martin and Red Bull were found to have made procedural breaches. Opinion on the outcome amongst F1 team personnel was divided, with Red Bull team principal Christian Horner "begrudgingly" accepting what he deemed to be a "draconian" punishment, stating that the loss of wind tunnel time could cost them between 0.25 and 0.5 seconds a lap in performance. Alpine's Otmar Szafnauer and Mercedes' Toto Wolff felt the FIA's decision was fair, with the latter stating that the "reputational damage" incurred by Red Bull would be enough to deter teams from breaching the cost cap in future. McLaren's Andreas Seidl, was less satisfied, saying that "the penalty doesn't fit the breach" and hoping for "stricter" penalties for future circumventions of the rules.

Results and standings

Grands Prix

Scoring system

Points were awarded to the top ten classified drivers, the driver who set the fastest lap during the Grand Prix, but only if one of the top ten, and the top three of sprint qualifying. In the case of a tie on points a countback system was used where the driver with the most first places is ranked higher. If the number of first places was identical then the number of second places was considered, and so on. If this procedure failed to produce a result, the FIA nominated the winner according to such criteria as it thinks fit. The points were awarded for every race using the following system:

World Drivers' Championship standings

Notes:
  – Driver did not finish the Grand Prix but was classified, as he completed more than 90% of the race distance.
  – Half points were awarded at the Belgian Grand Prix as less than 75% of the scheduled distance was completed. Fastest laps were not recognised in the final classification.

World Constructors' Championship standings

Notes:
  
  – Driver did not finish the Grand Prix, but was classified as he completed more than 90% of the race distance.
  – Half points were awarded at the Belgian Grand Prix as less than 75% of the scheduled distance was completed. Fastest laps were not recognised in the final classification.
 Rows are not related to the drivers: within each team, individual Grand Prix standings are sorted purely based on the final classification in the race (not by total points scored in the event, which includes points awarded for fastest lap and sprint qualifying).

Notes

References

External links

 

 
Formula One
Formula One seasons